is a tokusatsu superhero TV series about a giant cyborg.  The series was produced by Nippon Gendai and Senkosha (now Senko Planning), and aired on Tokyo Broadcasting System from October 8, 1972, to April 8, 1973, with a total of 26 episodes.

Plot description
The Shiranui Clan have planned for 2000 years to conquer Japan in retaliation for their nomadic ancestors being banished from the country by the Yamato Clan (who eventually became known as the Japanese people). Each armored ninja-like member of the clan controls a gigantic robot warrior in order to overthrow the "Yamato Government," as they call it.

In response to this terrorist threat, Japan's National Security Organization send agent Gentaro Shizuka (Shoji Ishibashi), disguised as what can best described as a Spaghetti Western version of a singing cowboy, to stop their plans with the assistance of comical, mountaineering-clad Goro Kirishima (Mitsuo Hamada). In an unusual direction for such tokusatsu (visual effects) programs, it is not the heroic but often surprisingly ruthless Gentaro but the bumbling, bespectacled Goro who has the power to become the giant cybernetic superhero Iron King by touching the medals on the sides of his funny red Turning Hat and yelling "Iron Shock!" when danger threatens.

However, often Iron King is unable to defeat the clan's giant robots without help from Gentaro, who wields a weapon called the Iron Belt that can become a slender rapier-like sword or an infinitely extendable metal whip capable of hurting giant monsters. In addition, transforming into the hydrogen oxide-powered Iron King quickly dehydrates Goro, and he can only remain as Iron King for a short period of time. Strangely, although Gentaro knows Iron King's time limit comes from exhausting his water supply he never manages to connect it with Goro's omnipresent thirst until the final episode.

In the tenth episode the Shiranui Clan is wiped out, but their place is taken by the skull-symboled keffiyeh-clad Phantom Militia (A/K/A the Phantom Opposition Party) who to enact their revolution against the Japanese government, use monsters. Their monsters initially appear to be traditional kaiju, though they are revealed to all be robots, commanded by agents of the Militia remotely.

And from the nineteenth episode to the end of the series, Gentaro and Goro battle black cloak and Puritan hat-clad white-masked aliens called  Titanians, who despite looking human, have various inhuman powers such as flight, body-possessing mind control, and the ability to enlarge themselves to giant size. Upon doing the latter they are then able to assume insect-like monster forms.

Episode list

DVD releases

On November 6, 2007, BCI Eclipse Entertainment Company LLC released the complete series of Iron King on DVD in Region 1. As of 2009, this release is now out of print as BCI Eclipse ceased operations.

On March 9, 2010, Mill Creek Entertainment re-released the entire series on DVD in Region 1.

Notes

References
  (From the Iron King liner notes booklet)

External links 
 

1972 Japanese television series debuts
1973 Japanese television series endings
Japanese superheroes
Tokusatsu television series
TBS Television (Japan) original programming